The 2018–19 Nemzeti Bajnokság I/B is the 51st season of the Nemzeti Bajnokság I/B,  Hungary's second tier Handball league.

Team information
There are 12–12 clubs in the 2 group, with three-three promoted teams from Nemzeti Bajnokság II.

Team changes

Promoted from 2017–18 Nemzeti Bajnokság II
Dorogi ESE
FKSE Algyő

Relegated from 2017–18 Nemzeti Bajnokság I
 Kecskeméti NKSE
 Vasas SC

Relegated to 2018–19 Nemzeti Bajnokság II
 Pilisvörösvári KSK 
 Csurgói NKC
 Marcali VSZSE
 VKL SE Győr
 Hódmezővásárhelyi LKC
 K. Szeged SE
 Gyömrő VSK

Promoted to 2018–19 Nemzeti Bajnokság I
 Mosonmagyaróvári KC SE
 Eszterházy KESC

Arenas and locations

Western Group
The following 12 clubs compete in the NB I/B (Western) during the 2018–19 season:

Eastern Group
The following 12 clubs compete in the NB I/B (Eastern) during the 2017–18 season:

See also
 2018–19 Magyar Kupa
 2018–19 Nemzeti Bajnokság I
 2018–19 Nemzeti Bajnokság II

References

External links
 Hungarian Handball Federaration 
 handball.hu

Handball leagues in Hungary
Nemzeti Bajnoksag I/B Women